Disappear Here was the third full studio album by the British band Silver Sun.  The release came seven years after their second album Neo Wave and was their first release on the Invisible Hands label.  The album was unusual in that lead vocalist James Broad recorded the album single-handedly, whilst the rest of the band were continuing to work on various other side projects.  However, the band continued to work together on live gigs to promote the album.

Track listing
All tracks written by James Broad.
"Bubblegum" – 3:47
"Lies" – 3:00
"Can't get you out of my Head" – 3:34
"Found you in a Dream" – 1:48
"Immediate" – 2:52
"Jody" – 3:24
"Garlic" – 3:08
"Pipsqueak" – 2:19
"She wants a Puppy, She'll have a Puppy" – 3:37
"You can't Kill Rock & Roll" – 3:04

Personnel
James Broad - All instruments

References

Silver Sun albums
2005 albums